The Bahamas Aquatics Federation (BAF) is the governing body of swimming in the Bahamas. They are also responsible for the development of synchronized swimming, diving, water polo, open water swimming.  BAF is a member of the International Swimming Organization FINA and Central American and Caribbean Swimming Federation.

Facilities
The country has four 25-Metre pools and two 25-Yard Outdoor completion pools in Nassau, Bahamas. In May 2000 the Government of Bahamas constructed the Betty Kelly Keening National Swim Complex. The country now owns a 10 Lane 50 Meter Outdoor swimming pool accompanied by 8 -Lane 25 Meter Training pool.

References 

Swimming organizations
Sports governing bodies in the Bahamas